The Swan 80 Mk II was a sailboat designed by German Frers and built by Nautor's Swan and first launched in 2010. The hull is constructed using foamcored carbon-fibre reinforced construction using the pre-preg lay-up.

References

External links
 Nautor Swan
 German Frers Official Website

Sailing yachts
Keelboats
2010s sailboat type designs
Sailboat types built by Nautor Swan
Sailboat type designs by Germán Frers